The timeline of the Galileo spacecraft spans its launch in 1989 to the conclusion of its mission when it dove into and destroyed itself in the atmosphere of Jupiter in 2003.

Primary mission (1995–1997) 

The trip from Earth to Jupiter, the probe's exploration of the Jovian atmosphere, and an orbiter tour consisting of 11 orbits of Jupiter constituted Galileos primary mission.

On Jupiter Arrival Day (7 December 1995), the Galileo spacecraft was given a gravity-assist from Io and then subjected to the Jupiter orbit insertion (JOI) maneuver, which slowed the spacecraft down so that the planet could "catch" it. These two actions placed the orbiter on its proper trajectory to tour the Jovian moons. The Jupiter orbit insertion maneuver involved an orbit around the planet, which is referred to as the spacecraft's "zeroth" orbit. The spacecraft's "first," and by far longest, orbit around Jupiter followed the JOI and lasted nearly seven months. On 27 June 1996, this initial orbit culminated in a close encounter with Ganymede, the largest of the four Galilean satellites.

After the first Jupiter orbit of seven months, subsequent orbits were much shorter, ranging from one to two and a half months.

The orbiter tour included four close encounters with Ganymede, three with Europa, and three with Callisto. No Io encounters were planned for the primary mission (besides the flyby on arrival day) because mission scientists feared that the high radiation levels so close to Jupiter could damage the spacecraft and possibly end the project.

The primary mission ended in December 1997, two years after Jupiter arrival.

The Galileo mission used a two-character code to specify each orbit. The first character was the first letter of the name of the moon that would receive a flyby on the orbit, while the second character indicated the number of the orbit.

Orbit: C: Callisto; E: Europa; G: Ganymede; I: Io; J: Jovian

 Galileo Europa Mission (1997–1999) 

The Galileo project would have been considered a success even if the spacecraft had stayed operational only through the end of the primary mission on 7 December 1997, two years after Jupiter arrival. The orbiter was an extremely robust machine, however, with many backup systems. It showed no sign of quitting at the end of the primary mission, so it was given a highly focused set of new exploration objectives, defined in part by the findings of the primary mission. As some of these new objectives centered on investigating Europa in great detail, the new mission was appropriately called the "Galileo Europa Mission" (GEM). Mission objectives were not limited to Europa, however; they included analyses of other satellites, as well as of Jovian fields and particles and atmospheric characteristics. During GEM, some of the most important and spectacular observations of the volcanic moon Io were taken.

GEM ran for slightly over two years, from 8 December 1997 to 31 December 1999. It was a low-cost mission with a budget of only $30 million. At the end of the primary mission, most of the 200 Galileo staff members left for other assignments. The remaining bare-bones crew, about one-fifth the size of the primary mission, was left to run GEM and achieve the objectives of four separate studies:
 Europa campaign.
 Io campaign.
 Io plasma torus study.
 Jupiter water study.

On each flyby, the spacecraft took only two days of data versus the seven days it had taken during the primary mission. Minimal Jovian magnetic field data were collected. The GEM team did not include the expertise to deal with unexpected problems, as the primary mission had. When issues arose, specialists who had gone on to other missions were temporarily brought back and placed on "tiger teams" to work through the problems quickly.

 Galileo Millennium Mission 

Because the orbiter was continuing to operate well, a further extension to the original project, the Galileo Millennium Mission (GMM), was added to pursue answers to key questions raised during GEM. The original GMM schedule ran from January 2000 through March 2001, but it was then extended to the end of mission operations in January 2003.

The spacecraft met its demise in September 2003, when its trajectory took it on a collision course toward Jupiter and it burned up in the planet's atmosphere.

GMM conducted additional investigations of Europa, including a magnetic field measurement key to detecting the presence of liquid water. GMM also added to our knowledge of Io, studied the dynamics of Ganymede's unique magnetosphere, determined particle sizes in Jupiter's rings, and performed a joint investigation with the Cassini spacecraft, whose closest approach to Jupiter was on 30 December 2000.

Some of Galileos instruments were not operating at full performance during GMM because exposure to Jupiter's intense radiation belts had damaged them. This was not surprising; the total radiation that the spacecraft had received was three times the amount that its systems had been built to withstand. But even with its impaired systems, Galileo'' continued to make valuable observations and generate important scientific data.

References

External links 
Mission to Jupiter: a History of the Galileo Project, by Michael Meltzer, NASA SP 2007–4231 (on-line book)
Galileo News Archive
Galileo Satellite Image Mosaics 
The Radiation Effects on Galileo Spacecraft Systems at Jupiter, by Fieseler, et. al

Galileo program
Spaceflight timelines